St. Stanislaus Kostka Roman Catholic Church is a Roman Catholic church in Maspeth, Queens, New York City, whose parish was organized in 1872. Historically, it is one of only three churches in the area to have organized schools for its parishioners, known as the St. Stanislaus Kostka School. It belongs to the Parish of Saint Stanislaus Kostka - Transfiguration, together with Transfiguration Roman Catholic Church, .

History
One of the goals of building the church in 1872 was to provide a house of prayer and worship to local farmers living far away from St. Mary's Church that was located in the neighboring Winfield section of Woodside, Queens. Its original building was formerly located at 64-25 Perry Avenue in Maspeth, Queens. Its current pastor is Rev. Msgr. Joseph P. Calise.

See also
Holy Cross Roman Catholic Church (Queens)
St. Adalbert Roman Catholic Church

Bibliography
Maspeth...Our Town by Barbara Stankowski
Our Community, Its History and People by Walter J. Hutter, Rev. John D. O’Halloran, Maureen Walthers and Philip P. Agusta (Greater Ridgewood Historical Society)

References

External links

Roman Catholic churches in Queens, New York
Roman Catholic churches completed in 1925
1872 establishments in New York (state)
Religious organizations established in 1872
Maspeth, Queens